The 1925 Georgia Tech Golden Tornado football team represented the Georgia Tech Golden Tornado of the Georgia Institute of Technology during the 1925 Southern Conference football season. The Tornado was coached by William Alexander in his sixth year as head coach, compiling a record of 6–2–1. The team was captained by Doug Wycoff. It had one of the best defenses in school history.

The team most notably beat Penn State. It suffered losses to national champion Alabama and the defending national champion Notre Dame Fighting Irish. It also had a surprise tie with rival Auburn.

Before the season
1925 saw the south's widespread use of the forward pass. Coach William Alexander was a Heisman protege and utilized his "jump shift". Don Miller of Four Horsemen fame assisted Alexander in the backfield, and former star Tech tackle Bill Fincher assisted with the line.

Triple threat Doug Wycoff, mentioned for All-American by Lawrence Perry at the end of last year, was elected captain of the 1925 team, having been "the outstanding back of the South for the past two years." Coach Alexander called him "the best player ever to wear a cleat for Georgia Tech."

Schedule

Season summary

Week 1: Oglethorpe

Sources:

The season opened with a 13–7 defeat of Southern Intercollegiate Athletic Association (SIAA) champion Oglethorpe. Neither team scored in the first quarter, but in the second Wycoff went over for a 4-yard touchdown. The second Tech score came in the final quarter, when Carter Barron ran it in from 6 yards out following a long drive. A forward pass, Walsh to Campbell, got Oglethorpe's touchdown.

The starting lineup was Merkle (left end), Tharpe (left tackle), Godwin (left guard), Poole (center), Forrester (right guard), Carpenter (right tackle), Marshall (right end), Williams (quarterback), Barron (left halfback), Wycoff (right halfback), S. Murray (fullback).

Week 2: V. M. I.

Sources:

Tech beat VMI 33–0. In the second quarter, a pass from Murray to Wycoff added 24 yards. Carter Barron got it in from the 1-yard line some plays later. The next touchdown drive was highlighted by a 34-yard touchdown run. Murray scored yet another touchdown.  A 26-yard pass was caught by Johnny Marshall, and Tech drove down to the 1-yard line when the final quarter started. Ike Williams went across for a touchdown. With substitutes in the backfield for most of the final period, John Brewer scored a touchdown on another triple pass play, this time from the 6-yard line.

The starting lineup was Irwin (left end), Tharpe (left tackle), Godwin (left guard), Poole (center), Forrester (right guard), Carpenter (right tackle), Marshall (right end), Williams (quarterback), Barron (left halfback), Wycoff (right halfback), S. Murray (fullback).

Week 3: vs. Penn State

Sources:

The third week brought the highlight of the year — a defeat of Hugo Bezdek's previously undefeated Penn State Nittany Lions 16–7 in a howling wind in Yankee Stadium. Tech utilized its shift on nearly every play. Penn State scored first after a punt by Doug Wycoff into the wind gave them the ball at Tech's 30-yard line. From here, Penn State threw a forward pass from a cross buck formation. Dangerfield shook off three tacklers on his way to the goal just as the half ended.

A similar thing happened to start the second half and give Tech its score. Penn State's Gray got off a bad punt into the wind, nearly over his own goal line. Using its shift to perfection, Wycoff eventually got over the tying touchdown. After a fumble recovery, an 80-yard drive utilizing Wycoff and Sam Murray ended in a Carter Barron touchdown for the third score. After an interception, Ike Williams also added a 25-yard field goal.The starting lineup was Marshall (left end), Tharpe (left tackle), Godwin (left guard), Poole (center), Forrester (right guard), Carpenter (right tackle), Merkle (right end), Williams (quarterback), Wycoff (left halfback), Barron (right halfback), S. Murray (fullback).

Week 4: Florida

Sources:

Tech beat Florida 23–7. The Gators made just five first downs to Tech's 15.

Doug Wycoff scored two touchdowns. Wycoff scored first, and Ike Williams added the extra point. In the second period, Williams made a 12-yard field goal. Wycoff and Sam Murray scored in the third period, with one extra point converted by Williams.

The starting lineup was Merkle (left end), Carpenter (left tackle), Forrester (left guard), Poole (center), Godwin (right guard), Tharpe (right tackle), Marshall (right end), Williams (quarterback), Wycoff (left halfback), Barron (right halfback), S. Murray (fullback).

Week 5: Alabama

Sources:

The national champion Alabama Crimson Tide beat Georgia Tech 7–0 on a Johnny Mack Brown punt return for a touchdown. Pooley Hubert cleared two Tech players out of the way. "Hubert played the greatest game of his career and was called the greatest defensive back ever to appear on Grant Field". Tech turned the ball over on downs at the Alabama 28 and again at the Alabama 21. Star tackle Six Carpenter was injured. Tech was the only team all year to rush for more yardage and gain more first downs than Alabama.

The starting lineup was Merkle (left end), Tharpe (left tackle), Godwin (left guard), Poole (center), Forrester (right guard), Carpenter (right tackle), Marshall (right end), Williams (quarterback), Wycoff (left halfback), Barron (right halfback), S. Murray (fullback).

Week 6: Notre Dame

Sources:

Resembling its old form, Knute Rockne's defending national champion Notre Dame Fighting Irish defeated Georgia Tech 13–0. The game was played in a cold rain,  and Tech played its substitutes aside from Walt Godwin. All scores were made in the first half.

An interception by Red Edwards set up the first score. Christie Flanagan was the star for the Irish.

The starting lineup was Irwin (left end), Hood (left tackle), Godwin (left guard), Elliott (center), Angley (right guard), Hearn (right tackle), Crowley (right end), Morse (quarterback), Connelly (left halfback), Brewer (right halfback), Holland (fullback).

Week 7: at Vanderbilt

Sources:

Describing the most spectacular play he ever saw, coach William Alexander cites one from the 1925 game against the Vanderbilt Commodores. Wycoff was hurt, such that he elected to use his substitute Dick Wright with only minutes to go in the game. On a muddy field, Wright ran off tackle and dodged Vanderbilt's safety Gil Reese, "usually a sure tackler," to get the touchdown with a run to give Tech a 7–0 victory. The yearbook remarked, Wright "should have run for governor of Georgia right after he ran 56 yards against Vandy."

The starting lineup was Merkle (left end), Tharpe (left tackle), Godwin (left guard), Poole (center), Forrester (right guard), Cooper (right tackle), Marshall (right end), Williams (quarterback), Wycoff (left halfback), Barron (right halfback), S. Murray (fullback)

Week 8: Georgia

Sources:

Rivals Georgia and Georgia Tech met for the first time since 1916. Quarterback Ike Williams thought the game clock read five seconds remaining in the third quarter when in actuality it was five minutes.  Williams set up his offense for a field goal and kicked it to put Tech up 3–0 on first down. Luckily for Williams, Tech won 3–0. Georgia tried all kinds of forward passes in desperation.

Georgia end Smack Thompson would yell out in his sleep, and had said "Kill the SOB" in reference to Doug Wycoff leading up to the game. Once during the game, the two collided with each other, knocking each unconscious.

The starting lineup was Merckle (left end), Tharpe (left tackle), Godwin (left guard), Poole (center), Forrester (right guard), Fair (right tackle), Marshall (right end), Williams (quarterback), Wycoff (left halfback), Barron (right halfback), S. Murray (fullback).

Week 9: Auburn
Auburn surprised with a 7–7 tie in the final week. Doug Wycoff scored Tech's touchdown. Pea Green caught a 9-yard pass from Frank Tuxworth on Auburn's score, after a blocked Wycoff punt.

Postseason

Awards and honors

Doug Wycoff received 21 of a possible 32 first-team All-Southern selections of the Associated Press composite. Center Owen Poole got six. Guard Walt Godwin also made some All-Southern teams, and tackle Six Carpenter made second-team All-Southern for Norman E. Brown.

Godwin was named to Knute Rockne's All-America team. Wycoff and end Gus Merkle made Billy Evans's "National Honor Roll."

Legacy
Coach Alexander recalled "The work of Douglas Wycoff against Notre Dame two years in succession was brilliant in the extreme, as was his plunging against Penn. State when we defeated them twice." Morgan Blake, sports writer for the Atlanta Journal, said of an all-time All-Southern list: "It seems to us that one name is left out in this collection, who may have been the best all-around player the South has had.

"We have reference to Doug Wycoff of Tech who, for three straight years, was practically the unanimous all-Southern football choice, despite the fact that Georgia Tech had very lean years during his period of play at this institution. If Wycoff had been flanked by such a pair of halfbacks as Red Barron and Buck Flowers, or Thomason and Mizell while he was with the Jackets, he would have been an all-American. As it was he had to carry all of the offensive load and on the defense he was a wheelhorse. He was a great punter and passer. If Wycoff was not the best all-around player the South had produced then he was very close to the peak."

Personnel

Depth chart
The following chart depicts Tech's lineup during the 1925 season with games started at the position shown in parenthesis. The chart mimics the offense after the jump shift has taken place.

Lettermen

Line

Backfield

Substitutes

Unlisted

See also
1925 Southern Conference football season
1925 College Football All-Southern Team
1925 College Football All-America Team

Notes

Endnotes

References

 
 

Georgia Tech
Georgia Tech Yellow Jackets football seasons
Georgia Tech Golden Tornado football
1920s in Atlanta